Nestor Bayona (born 10 December 1985) is a Spanish conductor. He is a frequent guest conductor at the Polish National Radio Symphony Orchestra, the Transylvania State Philharmonic Orchestra and the Opéra de Marseille.

Life and career 
Born in Lleida, Nestor Bayona began his career as a pianist, training at the Conservatory de Lleida at the age of 6. He then moved to the Royal Northern College of Music in Manchester, where he studied Piano with Helen Krizos, before continuing onto the Geneva University of Music to study piano with Nelson Goerner and then conducting with Laurent Gay. He went on to pursue a postgraduate diploma in conducting at the Berlin University of the Arts with Steven Sloane.

During the 2021–22 season Néstor Bayona made his debut at the Palau de la Música Catalana with the Orquestra del Reial Cercle Artístic de Barcelona, as well as a debut at the Liceu as part of the OH!PÈRA initiative. In 2019, he also made his official conducting debut at the Berliner Philharmonie with the Deutsch-Skandinavische Jugend-Philharmonie  and at the Festival de La Roque-d'Anthéron 2019 with the soloist David Kadouch and the Orchestre Philharmonique de Marseille, which was broadcast live on France Musique.

Nestor Bayona previously served as assistant conductor to Lawrence Foster at the Opéra de Marseille and at the Polish National Radio Symphony Orchestra. He was also assistant to Henrik Nánási at the Liceu and to Steven Sloane at the Komische Oper Berlin.

As a conductor, Nestor Bayona also has experience in composing. During the pandemic, he re-orchestrated Verdi's Luisa Miller for a reduced ensemble of 20 musicians. He has also worked closely with Marin Alsop during her Japan tour with the Polish National Radio Symphony Orchestra in September 2022  as well as her conducting masterclasses in Katowice.

Awards 
In December 2022, Nestor Bayona was awarded Associate Member of the Royal Northern College of Music, presided by Sir John Tomlinson (bass) for his achievements as a musician 
In 2015, Nestor Bayona was awarded the Ciutat de Lleida International Award for his cultural contribution to his hometown

References

External links
 
 *

1985 births
Living people